Shelly (stylized as SHELLY, born 11 May 1984, in Yokohama, Kanagawa Prefecture) is a Japanese model, tarento, and television presenter. She has American citizenship. She is represented by Stardust Promotion.

Filmography

TV series

Current appearances

Quasi-regular appearances

Former appearances

One-off programmes

Radio

Serials

Advertisements

Others

References

Notes

Sources

External links
 
 
Tokyo MX*This Week Shelly (U-La-La @ 7 blog) 
U-La-La @ 7 (Official website) 

Japanese television personalities
Japanese female models
Japanese television presenters
Japanese radio personalities
Stardust Promotion artists
American expatriates in Japan
American models of Japanese descent
American people of Italian descent
People from Yokohama
1984 births
Living people
Japanese women television presenters
American women television presenters